The 2018 North East Lincolnshire Council election took place on 3 May 2018 to elect members of North East Lincolnshire Council in England. This was on the same day as other local elections.

Council make up
After the 2018 local election, the  political make up of the council was as follows:

Labour remained in minority control of the authority, with the support of Liberal Democrats. The authority was a target area for the Labour Party, hoping to regain seats that they had lost to UKIP in 2014. However, the Conservatives pulled off some unexpected victories in several wards on the authority, including wins in Freshney and Immingham for the first time since the late 2000s, and in Yarborough, Park and Croft Baker, where they hadn't won seats for over 25 years, long before NELC's creation.

Since the 2016 elections, former UKIP councillors Stephen Harness and Matthew Stinson who were sat as Independents at the time, joined the Conservative Party, while two further UKIP councillors, Nick Pettigrew and James Cairns, joined the Conservatives in 2017. Labour councillor Hazel Chase resigned her party and sat as an Independent, and would continue to do so after these elections, when she became the mayor for the 2018/19 municipal year. Liberal Democrat councillor Christina McGilligan-Fell quit her party in 2017 in protest at not being chosen as a parliamentary candidate for either Great Grimsby or Cleethorpes in the 2017 general election, and ran as an Independent in the former - losing her deposit. She rejoined the Liberal Democrats months after, in order to seek re-election under the party banner, but lost her seat nonetheless to the Conservatives. Less than a year after losing her seat, she was seen campaigning with the Conservatives for their candidate in her former ward in the 2019 local elections.

Two seats were fought in Immingham, due to the death of councillor Mike Burton in March 2018. Labour's Dave Bolton retained his seat on the authority by 3 votes after several recounts, but only for one year - the remaining term of office Burton had been elected for in 2015. The four-year seat was gained by Stewart Swinburn, a former Conservative councillor for the ward, who had lost his seat to Burton in 2011, and had failed to regain his seat in 2012, 2014 and 2016.

Shortly after these elections took place, a by-election was held to fill the vacancy in the Freshney ward in July 2018 due to the resignation of councillor Ray Sutton, following his decision to move out of the area. Labour's Sheldon Mill, who stood in Park in the elections in this set of elections, held the seat by a small margin of 42 votes over the Conservatives, but his win was short-lived and he lost the seat in the 2019 local elections to the Conservatives.

Ward results
Vote share changes are compared with the 2016 elections, with the exceptions of Waltham, West Marsh and Wolds, which are compared with 2015.

Croft Baker

Note: Incumbent Labour councillor Matthew Brown sought re-election in Yarborough having failed to be re-selected by party members here. This was also the first time the Liberal Democrats had not stood in Croft Baker since NELC's creation.

East Marsh

Freshney

 
Note: There was a recount ahead of the declaration of the result. Incumbent councillor Nick Pettigrew, who had since defected to the Conservatives, sought re-election in Waltham - which his new party had deemed a more likely seat he would win, but the new Conservative candidate narrowly won nonetheless.

Haverstoe

Heneage

 

Notes: Smith had fought this seat as an Independent in 2012 and for UKIP in 2015. O'Flynn quit TUSC only days before the election took place. This was the first time since 1995 that there was no Liberal Democrat candidate in the ward.

Humberston & New Waltham

 

Note: Harness had been elected as a UKIP councillor for this ward in 2013 and 2014, so an effective hold for him.

Immingham

 
 

Note: Two seats were fought in Immingham, due to the death of councillor Mike Burton in March 2018. Labour's Dave Bolton retained his seat after several recounts due to the closeness of the result, but only for one year, which was the remaining term of office Burton had been elected for in 2015. The four-year seat was gained by Stewart Swinburn, a former Conservative councillor for the ward, who had lost his seat to Burton in 2011 and had failed to regain a seat in Immingham in 2012, 2014 and 2016. His wife, Karen, who had been unsuccessful on this occasion, had been a councillor for Immingham between 2006 and 2010.

Park

 

Note: This was only the second occasion the Liberal Democrats had lost Park since NELC's creation (the first being when Labour gained it in 2012), in addition to being the first time the Conservatives had won Park on NELC.

Scartho

Note: Bailey was formerly a Lib Dem councillor for Yarborough between 2009 and 2012. Incumbent UKIP councillor Henry Hudson chose not to seek re-election.

Sidney Sussex

 

Note: Rodwell was the only Labour candidate to have won more than 50% vote share on the night.

South

 

Notes: Mickleburgh had been a West Marsh councillor since 2014 but was deselected by local members. Batson had previously fought this seat for UKIP in 2015 and fought it for the Conservatives in the June 2016 by-election.

Waltham

 
Note: Pettigrew had been a councillor in Freshney since 2014 (originally elected as UKIP, having joined the Tories in 2017).

West Marsh

 

Note: Watkin had been a councillor for this ward between 1999 and 2010.

Wolds

Yarborough

 

Note: Cairns had been a councillor here since 2014 (originally elected as UKIP, having joined the Tories in 2017), so effectively a hold for him.

References 

2018 English local elections
May 2018 events in the United Kingdom
2018
2010s in Lincolnshire